Gaume is a French surname. Notable people with the surname include:

Dallas Gaume (born 1963), Canadian ice hockey player
Jean-Joseph Gaume (1802–1879), French Roman Catholic theologian and author
Nicolas Gaume (born 1971), French entrepreneur and video games creator

French-language surnames